Argo Online (stylized as ARGO Online) is a hybrid free-to-play massively multiplayer online role-playing game developed by Green Forrest. The game borrows stylistic elements from high fantasy and steampunk themes.

mGame Corporation launched Argo Online on 4 August 2010 in Korea.
On 21 April 2011, Burda:ic launched the game for the western market for North America and Europe. On 1 March 2013, burda:ic announced the end of the European and North American service for Argo Online.
In Korea, the game continued to grow a large userbase and in 2011, Asiasoft announced the release of ARGO Online for the SEA market in 2012. On 1 July 2013, Games-Masters.com Ltd. announced that they will offer ARGO Online in Europe in 2014.

External links 
 South East Asian version of Argo Online
 Korean version of Argo Online
 European version of Argo Online

References

2010 video games
Massively multiplayer online role-playing games
Windows games
Windows-only games
Free online games
Free-to-play video games
Video games developed in South Korea
Asiasoft games